Events from the year 2010 in the British Virgin Islands.

Incumbents
Governor: 
 until August 5: David Pearey 
 August 5-August 20: V. Inez Archibald (acting)
 starting August 20: William Boyd McCleary
Premier: Ralph T. O'Neal

Events

August
 30 August 2010 - Hurricane Earl strikes the British Virgin Islands, breaking an 11-year hiatus from hurricanes.

Footnotes

 
2010s in the British Virgin Islands
British Virgin Islands